Sebastiania ramulosa is a species of flowering plant in the family Euphorbiaceae. It was described in 1924. It is native to São Paulo, Brazil.

References

Plants described in 1924
Flora of Brazil
ramulosa